The British Oceanographic Data Centre (BODC) is a national facility for looking after and distributing data about the marine environment. BODC is the designated marine science data centre for the United Kingdom and part of the National Oceanography Centre (NOC) — primarily at its facility in Liverpool, with small number of its staff in Southampton. The centre provides a resource for science, education and industry, as well as the general public.

History 
The origins of BODC go back to 1969 when NERC created the British Oceanographic Data Service (BODS). Located at the National Institute of Oceanography, Wormley in Surrey, its purpose was to: 
 Act as the UK's National Oceanographic Data Centre
 Participate in the international exchange of data as part of the Intergovernmental Oceanographic Commission (IOC) network of national data centres

In 1975, BODS was transferred to Bidston Observatory on the Wirral, near Liverpool, as part of the newly formed Institute of Oceanographic Sciences. The following year BODS became the Marine Information and Advisory Service (MIAS). Its primary activity was to manage the data collected from weather ships, oil rigs and data buoys.

The data banking component of MIAS was restructured to form BODC in April 1989. Its mission was to 'operate as a world-class data centre in support of UK marine science'. BODC pioneered a start to finish approach to marine data management. This involved:

 Assisting in the collection of data at sea
 Quality control of data
 Assembling the data for use by the scientists
 The publication of data sets on CD-ROM
In December 2004, BODC moved to the purpose-built Joseph Proudman Building on the campus of the University of Liverpool. A smaller number of its staff are based in the National Oceanography Centre (NOC), Southampton.

Aims 
 Work alongside scientists during marine research projects
 Provide quality control and archiving of oceanographic data
 Maintain an online source of information and improve public access to marine data
 Provide innovative marine data products

National role 

BODC is one of five designated data centres that make up the NERC Environmental Data Service (NERC EDS) and manage NERC's environmental data. The BODC has a number of national roles and responsibilities:

 Performing data management for NERC-funded marine projects
 Maintaining and developing its archive of marine data, the National Oceanographic Database (NODB)
 Managing, checking and archiving data from tide gauges around the UK coast for the National Tide Gauge Network, which aims to obtain high quality tidal information and to provide warning of possible flooding of coastal areas around the British Isles. This  is part of the National Tidal & Sea Level Facility (NTSLF)
 Hosting the Marine Environmental Data and Information Network (MEDIN)
 Working in partnership with other NERC marine research centres:
 British Antarctic Survey (BAS)
 National Oceanography Centre (NOC), Liverpool, formerly Proudman Oceanographic Laboratory (POL)
 National Oceanography Centre (NOC), Southampton
 Plymouth Marine Laboratory (PML)
 Scottish Association for Marine Science (SAMS)
 Sea Mammal Research Unit (SMRU)

International role 
BODC's international roles and responsibilities include:

 Contributing to the International Council for the Exploration of the Sea (ICES) Marine Data Management
 Creating, maintaining and publishing the General Bathymetric Chart of the Oceans (GEBCO) Digital Atlas
 BODC is one of over 60 national oceanographic data centres that form part of the IOC International Oceanographic Data and Information Exchange (IODE)

Projects and initiatives
The following are a selection of the projects that BODC is or has been involved with:

 Atlantic Meridional Transect (AMT)
The AMT programme  undertook a twice yearly transect between the UK and the Falkland Islands to study the factors determining the ecological and biogeochemical variability in the planktonic ecosystems.
 Data Assembly Centre (DAC) for UK Argo
The International Argo program  measures water properties across the world’s ocean using a fleet of robotic instruments that drift with the ocean currents and move up and down between the surface and a mid-water level.  Argo  data has hugely increased our capability to measure ocean heat content and feeds into weather forecasting at the Met Office
 Autosub Under Ice (AUI)
The AUI programme  investigated the role of sub-ice shelf processes in the climate system. The marine environment beneath floating ice shelves was explored using Autosub, an AUV.
 Marine Productivity (MarProd)
MarProd  helped to develop coupled models and observation systems for the pelagic ecosystem, with emphasis on the physical factors affecting zooplankton dynamics.
 Rapid Climate Change (RAPID)
The RAPID programme  aimed to improve understanding of the causes of sudden changes in the Earth's climate.
 Ocean Margin Exchange (OMEX)
The OMEX project  studied, measured and modelled the physical, chemical and biological processes and fluxes at the ocean margin – the interface between the open Atlantic ocean and the European continental shelf.
 SeaDataNet
SeaDataNet  aims to develop a standardised, distributed system providing transparent access to marine data sets and data products from countries in and around Europe.
System of Industry Metocean data for the Offshore and Research Communities (SIMORC)
SIMORC  aimed to create a central index and database of metocean data sets collected globally by the oil and gas industry.
Vocabulary Server
BODC operates the NERC Vocabulary Server Web Service , which provides access to controlled vocabularies of relevance to the scientific community.

External links 
 BODC homepage
 BODC News and events
 Natural Environment Research Council (NERC) homepage
 NERC Data centres
 NERC Data Discovery Service
 National Tidal and Sea Level Facility (NTSLF)

Data centers
Environment of the United Kingdom
Environmental science
Information technology organisations based in the United Kingdom
Oceanography
Marine biology
Marine geology
Natural Environment Research Council
Oceanographic organizations
Organisations based in Liverpool
Research institutes in Merseyside
Scientific organisations based in the United Kingdom
1969 establishments in the United Kingdom
Scientific organizations established in 1969